Cornufer elegans is a species of frog in the family Ceratobatrachidae.
It is endemic to Papua New Guinea.

Its natural habitats are subtropical or tropical moist lowland forests, plantations, rural gardens, urban areas, and heavily degraded former forest.

References 

elegans
Amphibians of Papua New Guinea
Amphibians described in 1970
Taxonomy articles created by Polbot